Wittichen Abbey is a former Poor Clares abbey in Wittichen in a narrow side valley of the Kleine Kinzig stream near Schenkenzell in the upper Kinzig valley in the Black Forest.

History 

The abbey was founded by Saint Luitgard of Wittichen in 1324. According to Luitgard, who came from the Schenkenzell village of Kaltbrunn-Vortal, God said to her on the site of the monastery: "Here you are to build me a house!" So she searched for other co-sisters and founded her abbey in the outback of Wittichen with 33 sisters.

The abbey found support from the dukes of Teck and the counts of Geroldseck as well as Queen Agnes of Hungary. Through her intervention the retreat was recognised as an abbey by John XXII.

Literature 
 Der Landkreis Rottweil, published by the Landesarchivdirektion Baden-Württemberg, Vo,.2, Ostfildern, 2003, pp. 156f

External links 
 
 Wittichen Abbey on the Schenkenzell website
 Wittichen Abbey on the website of Baukunst in Baden

Monasteries in Baden-Württemberg
Poor Clare monasteries
1320s establishments in the Holy Roman Empire
1324 establishments in Europe